Šentjur ( or) is a town in eastern Slovenia. It is the seat, and largest settlement, of the Municipality of Šentjur. The town lies on the Voglajna River east southeast of Celje. The settlement, and the entire municipality, are included in the Savinja Statistical Region, which is in the Slovenian portion of the historical Duchy of Styria.

Name
The name of the settlement was changed from Sveti Jurij pri Celju (literally, 'Saint George near Celje') to Šentjur pri Celju in 1952. The town was renamed again from Šentjur pri Celju to Šentjur in 1990.

Church
The parish church, which the settlement gets its name from, is dedicated to Saint George (colloquially šent Jur(ij)) and belongs to the Roman Catholic Diocese of Celje. It was built between 1708 and 1721.

References

External links
 
 Šentjur on Geopedia

Populated places in the Municipality of Šentjur
Cities and towns in Styria (Slovenia)